Brachiolia is a genus of moths belonging to the subfamily Tortricinae of the family Tortricidae.

Species
Brachiolia amblopis (Meyrick, 1911)
Brachiolia egenella (Walker, 1864)
Brachiolia obscurana Razowski, 1966
Brachiolia wojtusiaki Razowski, 1986

See also
List of Tortricidae genera

References

 , 2005: World Catalogue of Insects vol. 5 Tortricidae.
  1986: The data on Tortricini (Lepidoptera, Tortricidae) published after 1966. , Acta zoologica cracoviensia, 29: 423–4440. full article.

External links
tortricidae.com

Tortricini
Tortricidae genera
Taxa named by Józef Razowski